Lucía Álvarez Vázquez (born November 28, 1948) is a Mexican composer and pianist widely known throughout Latin America. Born in Mexico City, Álvarez received her degree in piano and composition from the School of Music at the National Autonomous University of Mexico. She studied under Carlos Vázquez, Pablo Castellanos, Jorge Suárez, Américo Caramuta and Pierre van Hawe. Her music reflects aspects of Neo-romantic traditions rather than avant-garde styles that popularized throughout the late 20th century. Since the 1970s, Álvarez has composed music for films, television, and more than 100 concert works, including duets and quartets for strings, chamber music, and symphonic orchestras. Her work includes Midaq Alley (1995), for which she won the Ariel Award for Best Original Score in 1995, The Beginning and the End (1993), and Bedtime Fairy Tales for Crocodiles (2002). She is considered one of the best composers in the history of Mexican cinema.

References

Sources

External links
Lucía Álvarez - IMDb
Nuestro socios y su obra - Lucía Álvarez
SensaCine - Biografia
Ariel de Oro para Lucía Álvarez - UNAM
The Sphinx Catalog for Latin-American Cello Works - Lucia Álvarez
Sociedad de Autores y Compositores de México

1948 births
Living people
Mexican classical composers
Mexican women classical composers
Women film score composers
Women television composers
Mexican film score composers
Musicians from Mexico City
National Autonomous University of Mexico alumni
Academic staff of the National Autonomous University of Mexico
20th-century Mexican musicians
20th-century classical composers
21st-century Mexican musicians
21st-century classical composers
20th-century women composers
21st-century women composers